The meridian 18° east of Greenwich is a line of longitude that extends from the North Pole across the Arctic Ocean, Europe, Africa, the Atlantic Ocean, the Southern Ocean, and Antarctica to the South Pole.

The 18th meridian east forms a great circle with the 162nd meridian west.

From Pole to Pole
Starting at the North Pole and heading south to the South Pole, the 18th meridian east passes through:

{| class="wikitable plainrowheaders"
! scope="col" width="125" | Co-ordinates
! scope="col" | Country, territory or sea
! scope="col" | Notes
|-
| style="background:#b0e0e6;" | 
! scope="row" style="background:#b0e0e6;" | Arctic Ocean
| style="background:#b0e0e6;" |
|-
| 
! scope="row" | 
| Islands of Nordaustlandet and Spitsbergen, Svalbard
|-
| style="background:#b0e0e6;" | 
! scope="row" style="background:#b0e0e6;" | Atlantic Ocean
| style="background:#b0e0e6;" | Norwegian Sea
|-
| 
! scope="row" | 
| Island of Senja and the mainland
|-
| 
! scope="row" | 
|
|-
| style="background:#b0e0e6;" | 
! scope="row" style="background:#b0e0e6;" | Baltic Sea
| style="background:#b0e0e6;" | Gulf of Bothnia
|-valign="top"
| 
! scope="row" | 
| Passing through Stockholm, right through Friends Arena
|-valign="top"
| style="background:#b0e0e6;" | 
! scope="row" style="background:#b0e0e6;" | Baltic Sea
| style="background:#b0e0e6;" | Passing between the islands of Stora Karlsö and Gotland, 
|-
| 
! scope="row" | 
| Passing through the centre of Bydgoszcz
|-
| 
! scope="row" | 
|
|-
| 
! scope="row" | 
|
|-
| 
! scope="row" | 
|
|-
| 
! scope="row" | 
| Passing just west of Slavonski Brod
|-
| 
! scope="row" | 
| Passing near Mostar
|-valign="top"
| 
! scope="row" | 
| Mainland (for about 6 km) and the island of Koločep. Passing just west of Dubrovnik
|-
| style="background:#b0e0e6;" | 
! scope="row" style="background:#b0e0e6;" | Mediterranean Sea
| style="background:#b0e0e6;" | Adriatic Sea
|-
| 
! scope="row" | 
| Municipality of Gallipoli, Apulia.
|-
| style="background:#b0e0e6;" | 
! scope="row" style="background:#b0e0e6;" | Mediterranean Sea
| style="background:#b0e0e6;" |
|-
| 
! scope="row" | 
|
|-
| 
! scope="row" | 
|
|-
| 
! scope="row" | 
|
|-
| 
! scope="row" | 
|
|-valign="top"
| 
! scope="row" | 
|
|-
| 
! scope="row" | 
|
|-
| 
! scope="row" | 
|
|-valign="top"
| 
! scope="row" | 
| Northern Cape Western Cape
|-
| style="background:#b0e0e6;" | 
! scope="row" style="background:#b0e0e6;" | Atlantic Ocean
| style="background:#b0e0e6;" | 
|-
| 
! scope="row" | 
| Western Cape
|-
| style="background:#b0e0e6;" | 
! scope="row" style="background:#b0e0e6;" | Atlantic Ocean
| style="background:#b0e0e6;" | Passing just west of Dassen Island,  (at )
|-
| style="background:#b0e0e6;" | 
! scope="row" style="background:#b0e0e6;" | Southern Ocean
| style="background:#b0e0e6;" |
|-
| 
! scope="row" | Antarctica
| Queen Maud Land, claimed by 
|-
|}

See also
17th meridian east
19th meridian east

e018th meridian east